Metarctia unicolor is a moth of the  subfamily Arctiinae. It was described by Oberthür in 1880. It is found in Angola, the Democratic Republic of Congo, Eritrea, Ethiopia and Kenya.

References

 Natural History Museum Lepidoptera generic names catalog

Metarctia
Moths described in 1880